Arnaldo Bonfanti (born March 18, 1978) is a footballer who plays for club ITALIANTEAM.

He played 1 game in the Serie A for Atalanta B.C. in the 1996/97 season. In 1999, he was sold to Reggiana in co-ownership deal. His son Nicholas, born the 1st January 2002, plays as a striker for Inter Milan youth team.

External links
 
 LaSerieD.com Profile 

1978 births
Living people
Italian footballers
Serie A players
Atalanta B.C. players
A.C. Reggiana 1919 players
Fermana F.C. players
S.S. Chieti Calcio players
Novara F.C. players
Calcio Lecco 1912 players
A.S. Sambenedettese players
U.S. Pergolettese 1932 players
Virtus Bergamo Alzano Seriate 1909 players
Association football defenders